Architectural coatings or paints are paints and other coatings used to paint the exteriors and interiors of buildings, often called exterior wall coatings or external masonry coatings.  Clear varnishes and lacquers are generally excluded.  Such products are usually designated for specific purposes such as roof coatings, wall paints, or deck finishes. Coatings are eco-friendly building material that increases the efficiency of energy used and reduces impact on human well-being and the environment. The coatings are typically applied with brushes, rollers or sprayers. Wall coatings are generally not suitable for amateur or DIY application as the installation of a wall coating typically requires not only training and skill, but specialist equipment such as a paint spraying machine.  Most masonry surfaces can be treated an exterior wall coating, such as render, pebbledash, stone, stucco or brick. Most coatings are designed to be microporous in nature, allowing captive moisture within the wall to evaporate outside, whilst not allowing the passage of water to be drawn inside the building, thus largely providing a secondary feature apart from decoration, and that is to weatherproof a wall, and to stop damp forming inside the building. These coatings are intended for on-site application and do not include "factory-applied coatings for building products such as vinyl siding or aluminium window frames [that] may ultimately be used for architectural end-uses".

See also
Industrial coating

References

Coatings
Painting materials
Architectural terminology